Stone Ridge is a ridge surmounted by Mount Swinford, 1550 m, extending southwest to northeast between Ringer Glacier and Dahe Glacier in the Saint Johns Range of Victoria Land. Named by the Advisory Committee on Antarctic Names in 2005 after Brian Stone, United States Antarctic Program logistics specialist with Antarctic Support Associates from 1990; Science Cargo Coordinator for McMurdo Station cargo, 1992–95; Terminal Operations Manager, McMurdo Station, 1995–97; Terminal Operations Manager, Christchurch, 1997–2000; Research Support Manager, Office of Polar Programs, National Science Foundation, 2000–05.

References

Ridges of Victoria Land